Ilimane Diop Gaye (born 4 April 1995) is a professional basketball player for UCAM Murcia in the Liga ACB. Although he was born in Senegal, Diop officially represents Spain when being on international duty since he was a baby when his family settled in Spain. Previously, he has led their junior teams to multiple bronze medals.

Professional career 
A product of Spanish powerhouse Saski Baskonia, Diop was sent out on loan to minor league team to gain playing time and experience. He made his debut for Baskonia in the Spanish top-flight Liga ACB in the course of the 2013-14 campaign.

An early entry candidate for the 2016 NBA draft, he later withdrew his name.

On July 10, 2021, he has signed with Gran Canaria of the Spanish Liga ACB.

On July 5, 2022, Gran Canaria released Diop.

On July 13, 2022, he has signed with UCAM Murcia in the Liga ACB.

International career
After achieving a bronze medal with the under-16 team and the under-18 team, on 11 July 2016, Diop made his debut with the national team in a friendly game played in Burgos against Angola. He scored four points and grabbed three rebounds to collaborate in the win by 85–61.

Player profile 
Standing 6'11" with a wingspan of 7'11" feet, Diop is regarded as one of the most potent players in the Liga ACB and possibly a future NBA draft selection. Length has been an inevitable problem for his opponents, who have struggled against the pick-and-roll and rebounds. He is also noted for his raw talent that could grow into a "great basketball body." Balance, footwork, and strength have remained intangibles for the center.

Personal life
His brother Mamadou is also a basketball player who previously played in the same Spanish basketball squad as he did.

References

External links
 Ilimane Diop at acb.com 
 Ilimane Diop at eurobasket.com
 Ilimane Diop at euroleague.net
 Ilimane Diop at FIBA
 

1995 births
Living people
Araberri BC players
Basketball players from Dakar
CB Gran Canaria players
CB Murcia players
Centers (basketball)
Liga ACB players
Naturalised citizens of Spain
Saski Baskonia players
Senegalese emigrants to Spain
Spanish men's basketball players
Spanish people of Senegalese descent
Spanish sportspeople of African descent